The BSA Scout is a small open two-seater front-wheel drive car, manufactured and sold by subsidiaries of The Birmingham Small Arms Company Limited, launched at the beginning of April 1935. On account of its front-wheel drive and low centre of gravity it was said to be remarkably stable taking corners in safety which would be impossible with a normal design. This new addition to the range of small open cars for young motorists was intended to further embellish BSA's reputation for sound design, robust construction and complete reliability.

Mechanicals
At the front of the car was the engine, clutch, gearbox and a short stiff propeller shaft to the worm and spur driven differential and front wheel brake. All these mechanicals were (flexibly) mounted as one unit positioned in a reverse to the usual order, the differential at the very front of the car.

Engine
The car's four-cylinder, 9 (RAC) horsepower  engine and transmission had powered thousands of BSA three-wheelers over the previous five years.

Transmission
The gearbox was centrally controlled by a lever in the facia providing three forward speeds and reverse The propeller shafts from the differential to each wheel had flexible fabric joints and enclosed universal joints. The multi-plate clutch had two light alloy discs with cork inserts and ran in oil.

Chassis
The conventionally designed chassis was made of channel section side members suitably braced by cross members.
Suspension was by eight quarter-elliptic springs in front—four to each wheel giving independent front springing. 

Rear suspension was by ordinary half-elliptical springs to a beam axle. The single brake for the front wheels was a part of the differential unit. The rear brakes were on each wheel. 

Electrical equipment was six-volt and a five lamp set supplied with dip and switch control to the head lights was included.

Bodies
The pneumatic cushioned upholstery was leather and the frame of the body of ash panelled in aluminium.
An open two-seater it had attractive and sporting lines yet with enough leg and elbow room.

During 1936 an open four-seater sports tourer body also became available at £169.10.0. and a two-seater coupé complete with recessed traffic indicators, sunshine roof and other closed car fittings: £185. These bodies became known as series 3.

A new two-seater drophead coupé was announced in August 1939 (similar to the car which won the coachwork award in the Welsh Rally. The price was to be £195

Price
Initially (open two-seater) £149.10.0

Performance
The car was built for speeds approaching .

Series 2 – Engine upgrade

Series 3 – variants of 2
Also for the October 1936 Motor Show—either a two-seater coupé by Mulliners or a 4-seater open tourer on the same chassis as the 2-seater named series 2.

Series 4 – August 1937
Shock absorbers were fitted all round. Front braking was now by brakes on the front wheels.
 The price of the two-seater and the two-seater de luxe had been reduced to £149.10.0 and £156.10.0 respectively.
 Four-seater £159.10.0
 Four-seater de luxe  £166.10.0
 Coupé de luxe £179. The coupé was now only available with the de luxe equipment.
The motoring correspondent of The Times described the two-seater as "a rakish looking body with two wide cut-away doors with cord-operated locks and pockets. The floor is flat and unobstructed, there is luggage space in the tonneau behind the squab with a cover, and the hood folds down completely when it is concealed. There is a single panel safety glass folding screen with a curved top line and the detachable side screens are stored behind the squab. The instruments are in front of the driver with a good-sized cupboard and grabrail on the left."

"The coupé two-seater is of airline type and there is a bench type of seat with adjustment to the back and good luggage space behind. A sliding roof, safety glass windows, a windscreen which can be wound out, a rear blind, ventilators in the side of the scuttle, large headlamps with stone guards, a spare wheel, door locks, a sports spring steering wheel, flush fitting traffic indicators, a roof light and an inside reflecting mirror are included."

Series 5
A switch to a more powerful 12-volt electrical system and to Bendix cable brakes.

Series 6 – October 1938
Easy-clean (pressed steel) wheels are now fitted in place of the wire wheels. The coupé is now a 4-seater. The 9.8 engine has been redesigned, water-jacketing has been increased and a three-bearing crankshaft incorporating improved lubrication is now provided. Induction improvements include larger valves and a downdraught carburettor. The front and rear tracks are now the same— and the wheelbase of all cars is now .

A new drophead coupé 2-seater was announced on 1 August 1939 but war broke out on 3 September and very few of these cars were made.

References

External links

 "for those who know a thoroughbred"
 Old catalogues

Scout
Cars introduced in 1935